Yorkdale Bus Terminal is located at 1 Yorkdale Road, Toronto, Ontario, Canada. It occupies the lowest level of an office building adjacent to Yorkdale Shopping Centre and is connected directly to Yorkdale subway station by a pedestrian bridge.

Its creation was announced by James Snow, the Ontario Minister of Transportation and Communications, in March 1977. Construction of the station started soon after, and was expected to be completed by late 1977.

The bus terminal is strategically located, in the middle of what was formerly the City of North York, at Allen Road on the south side of Highway 401, the main transportation artery across the Greater Toronto Area. This is ideal for providing GO Transit commuter bus services to points east and west of the city and long-distance intercity coach connections by Ontario Northland. When it opened on October 12, 1979, it was a hub for Gray Coach interurban bus service and, until 2000, for the Toronto Airport Express bus service originally operated by Gray Coach and, after 1993, by Pacific Western Transportation.

Because of the office building directly above the terminal, there is a severe height restriction within the terminal, and this prevented GO Transit from operating their current fleet of double-decker buses into the terminal until Enviro 500 'Super-Lo' models became available.

Services

Platform designations
1 - Spare
2 - GO Bus eastbound Route 36, 36B Brampton via Hwy. 427 Express to York Mills Bus Terminal
3 - GO Bus westbound Route 19 Mississauga/North York to Square One GO and GO Bus Route 27, 27A, 27F Milton Hwy. 401 service to Milton GO
4 - Spare
5 - Spare
6 - GO Bus eastbound Route 92, 92A Oshawa/Yorkdale to Scarborough and Oshawa GO Station
7 - GO Bus westbound Route 36, 36B Brampton via Hwy. 427 Express to Brampton
8 - Spare
9 - GO Bus westbound Route 34 Pearson/North York Service to Airport and GO Bus Route 33, 33A, 33B, 33E Guelph Hwy. 410 Service to Guelph
9 - GO Bus eastbound route 34 Pearson/North York Service to Finch GO Bus Terminal
10 - Spare
11 - Spare
12 - GO Bus Route northbound 66, 66A East Gwillimbury Hwy. 400 Service to East Gwillimbury GO Station
13 - Ontario Northland northbound to North Bay/Timmins, northbound to Parry Sound/Sudbury and Express service to North Bay

Local bus connections
Bus stop is located on the west side of Yorkdale Road to the north of the terminal.
 47 Lansdowne (TTC)

References

External links

GO Transit bus terminals
1979 establishments in Ontario
Transport infrastructure completed in 1979